Northgate Mall is an enclosed shopping mall in Northgate, Ohio. Built in 1972, the mall currently has only one vacant anchor store out of the two anchor stores that were once Sears and Macy's.

History
Construction on the mall began in 1970, on the site of a former airport. It opened on September 10, 1972, anchored by Sears, McAlpin's and Pogue's. The mall also included a Kroger supermarket. Pogue's became L. S. Ayres in 1984, and then J. C. Penney in 1988. Lazarus was added as a fourth anchor in 1993 and became Lazarus-Macy's in 2003 and then Macy's in 2005. Dillard's acquired McAlpin's in 1999, and that anchor store closed in 2009.

JCPenney closed their anchor store in 2006 and moved to a new location at Stone Creek Towne Center, just north of the mall property. The Pogue's/JCPenney anchor store was demolished in 2007 for construction of a 14-screen Rave multiplex movie theater, but construction on the theater never began, after the mall's then-owners defaulted on a $74 million loan.

The Xscape 14 Theaters at Northgate Mall opened in lieu of the Rave multiplex in January of 2015 and is still operational to date (JAN 2023).

In 2012, the mall was sold to Tabani Group. The vacant Dillard's anchor store was subdivided into four big-box stores in 2013 - DSW, Marshalls, Michaels, and Ulta. A space briefly occupied by Famous Labels in 2010 became Burlington Coat Factory in 2013.  In 2014, an H. H. Gregg store was added in a new structure on the north side of the old Dillard's structure. That store closed in 2017. Ashley Furniture also opened in 2014 (closed in summer 2020). In 2015, the site of the demolished JCPenney anchor was filled when an Xscape theater was built.

The Sears anchor store closed in November 2018, as part of a plan to close 46 stores nationwide, leaving Macy’s as the sole remaining anchor.

In December 2018, the local township trustees completed a study to investigate the feasibility of creating a mixed-used facility on the mall property, to also include residential development.

On December 26, 2019, an incident where over a hundred teens stormed the mall at night, believed to be a result of a social media post gathering the youths to come to the mall at a certain time, occurred and caused a panic in both shoppers and store employees and resulted in a massive police response and evacuation of the mall. No injuries were reported and several arrests were made. Coincidentally, this incident happened on the fourth anniversary of a similar and much worse incident at a mall called St. Matthews in Louisville, Kentucky, where up to 2,000 teens stormed the mall on December 26, 2015.

In January 2020, Macy’s announced that they would close in March 2020 as part of a plan to close 125 stores nationwide.  This left the mall with no traditional anchor stores.

Shortly after Macy’s announced its store closure, township officials announced plans to convert the mall into an outdoor lifestyle center similar to nearby centers in Cincinnati like Rookwood Commons and Pavilion in Norwood or Liberty Center in neighboring Butler County. This project would not start for at least a couple years as funding and official plans and contractors are needed and therefore, no timeframe was revealed on the plan as of now.

In November 2021, online auction site BidSoFlo.com leased the former Macy's anchor store and is still currently a tenant there to date (JAN 2023).

As of 2022, the Property Management office for Northgate Mall had a complete turnover of all its staff in order to achieve newfound success for the retail center overall. The Property Management office moved their office from a little known 2nd floor space of the mall to the main floor of the mall itself in hopes to make their office more accessible to the public and their tenants. Their new office is located at the West End of the mall near the vacant former Sears anchor store (JAN 2023).

References

External links
Official website

Shopping malls in Hamilton County, Ohio
Shopping malls established in 1972